Hebbal may refer to several places in Karnataka, India:

 Hebbal, Bangalore, a neighborhood in Bangalore
 Hebbal Lake, Bangalore
 Hebbal-Kittayya inscription
 Hebbal (Vidhana Sabha constituency)
 University of Agricultural Sciences, Bangalore
 Kendriya Vidyalaya Hebbal, Bangalore
 Sindhi High School, Hebbal
 Hebbal, Mysore, a neighborhood in Mysore
 Hebbal Lake, Mysore
 Hebbal, Krishnarajanagara, a village in Krishnarajanagara Taluk, Mysore district
 Hebbal, Bagalkot, a village in Mudhol Taluk, Bagalkot district
 Hebbal, Hukeri, a village in Hukeri Taluk, Belgaum district
 Hebbal, Khanapur, a village in Khanapur Taluk, Belgaum district
 Hebbal, Bijapur, a village in Basavana Bagevadi Taluk, Bijapur district
 Hebbal, Davanagere, a village in Davanagere Taluk, Davanagere district
 Hebbal, Dharwad, a village in Navalgund Taluk, Dharwad district
 Hebbal, Gadag, a village in Shirhatti Taluk, Gadag district
 Hebbal, Gulbarga, a village in Chitapur Taluk, Kalaburagi district
 Hebbal, Hassan, a village in Belur Taluk, Hassan district
 Hebbal, Koppal, a village in Gangawati Taluk, Koppal district
 Hebbal, Uttara Kannada, a village in Supa Taluk, Uttara Kannada district
 Hebbal (B), a village in Shorapur Taluk, Yadgir district
 Hebbal (K), a village in Shorapur Taluk, Yadgir district
 Hebbal Kaval, a village in Krishnarajanagara Taluk, Mysore district
 Hebbalaguppe, a village in Heggadadevankote Taluk, Mysore district
 Goge Hebbal,  a village in Manvi Taluk, Raichur district
 Hebbalagere, a village in Channagiri Taluk, Davanagere district
 Hebbalahatti, a village in Bijapur Taluk, Bijapur district
 Hebbale, Somvarpet, a village in Somvarpet Taluk, Kodagu district
 Hebbale, Virajpet, a village in Virajpet Taluk, Kodagu district
 Hebbale, Hassan, a village in Arkalgud Taluk, Hassan district
 Hebbalalu, Hassan, a village in Channarayapatna Taluk, Hassan district
 Hebbalalu, Ramanagara, a village in Magadi Taluk, Ramanagara district

See also
 Akkihebbal, a village in Krishnarajpet Taluk, Mandya district
 Hebballi (disambiguation)